Robert Brockie Hunter, Baron Hunter of Newington LLD MBE DL FRSE (14 July 1915 – 24 March 1994) was a physician and university administrator. He was the personal physician to Field Marshal Montgomery, during the Second World War in North west Europe from 1944 to 1945. To friends and colleagues he was known as Bob Hunter.

Life
He was born on 14 July 1915 the son of Margaret Thorburn (née Brockie) and Robert Marshall Hunter. He was educated at George Watson's College in Edinburgh then studied Medicine at the University of Edinburgh graduating MB ChB in 1938. In the Second World War he served in the Royal Army Medical Corps and was later appointed as personal physician to Field Marshal Montgomery. He was demobilised with the rank of Major and returned to Edinburgh to work under Derrick Dunlop.

From 1947 to 1948 he was lecturer in Therapeutics, at the University of Edinburgh, and in 1948 was lecturer in Clinical Medicine at St Andrews University. He was appointed Professor of Materia Medica, Pharmacology and Therapeutics from 1948 to 1967 and was also Dean of the Faculty of Medicine from 1958 to 1962. In 1963 he became a member of the Ministry of Health Committee on Safety of Drugs and served on this committee until 1968. In academia he moved to the University of Dundee in 1967 becoming Professor of Materia Medica, Pharmacology and Therapeutics, from 1967 to 1968. He was then appointed Vice-Chancellor of the University of Birmingham in 1968, a post he held until 1981. From 1973 to 1980 he was a member of the DHSS Independent Scientific Committee on Smoking and Health.

Following the revelations in 1962 of the thalidomide disaster of the three previous years Hunter was appointed to the Committee on the Safety of Drugs and was Chairman of the Clinical Trials Sub-Committee.

In 1964 he was elected a Fellow of the Royal Society of Edinburgh. His proposers were Anthony Elliot Ritchie, George Howard Bell, Ernest Geoffrey Cullwick and James Macdonald.

Following his peerage in 1978 he was an active participant in the House of Lords and was a vocal supporter of the National Health Service.

He died of a heart attack while in his garden in Birmingham on 24 March 1994.

Honours & Arms
11 October 1945 - appointed a Member of the Order of the British Empire (MBE)
1 November 1977 - Knighted
17 July 1978 - created a Life Peer as Baron Hunter of Newington, of Newington in the District of the City of Edinburgh

Family
He was married in 1940 to Kathleen Margaret Douglas with whom he had three sons and one daughter.

References

Academics of the University of Dundee
1915 births
1994 deaths
Vice-Chancellors of the University of Birmingham
Academics of the University of Edinburgh
Academics of the University of St Andrews
Crossbench life peers
Knights Bachelor
Members of the Order of the British Empire
Life peers created by Elizabeth II